The Rivière de la Grande Loutre is a tributary of the Péribonka River, flowing in the unorganized territory of Passes-Dangereuses, in the Maria-Chapdelaine Regional County Municipality, in the administrative region of Saguenay–Lac-Saint-Jean, in the province of Quebec, in Canada.

The upper part of the watershed of the Grande Loutre river is served by the forest road R0206 (north–south direction) which passes between Dubray Lake and lac de Bransac. From the south, this road goes up the Mistassibi River. A few secondary roads serve the area for forestry and recreational tourism purposes.

Forestry is the main economic activity in the sector; second, recreational tourism activities.

The surface of the Grande Loutre River is usually frozen from late November to early April, however safe traffic on the ice is generally from early December to early April.

Geography 
The main neighboring watersheds of the Grande Loutre river are:
 North side: Péribonka River, Deux Milles lake, Natipi lake, Indicator Lake, Pluto Lake;
 East side: Péribonka River, Savane River, Piacouadie Lake;
 South side: Péribonka River, Machisque Lake, Onistagane Lake, lake Gazeau;
 West side: Témiscamie Lake, Petit lac Témiscamie, Témiscamie River, Coursay Lake, lake Albanel, Mistassini Lake.

The Grande Loutre river takes its source at the mouth of Dubray Lake in the unorganized territory of Passes-Dangereuses, or to:
  northwest of Onistagane Lake which is crossed by the Péribonka River;
  to the southwest of a curve in the course of the Péribonka River;
  southwest of the mouth of the Grande Loutre river (confluence with the Péribonka river);
  northwest of the dam at the mouth of lake Péribonka;
  north-west of the center of the village of Chute-des-Passes.

Upper course of the Grande Loutre river (segment of )

  easterly, to the southwest shore of lac de Bransac;
  towards the North, crossing lac de Bransac, until at its mouth. Note: This lake receives on the northwest side the discharge of a set of lakes including Lake Blanot;
  towards the South-East crossing Palairet Lake in bypassing the peninsulas which segment this lake into five parts, up to its mouth;

Intermediate course of the Grande Loutre river (segment of )

  towards the east by crossing two series of rapids, towards the north in a marsh area and collecting the discharge (coming from the west) of some lakes, then forming a hook of 180 degrees east at the end of the segment, to the east shore of an unidentified lake;
  towards the South-East, zigzagging around the peninsulas by crossing an unidentified lake on its full length until its mouth. Note: This lake receives the discharge (coming from the South) of some lakes;
  first east across two unidentified lakes, then south-east across  an unidentified lake to its mouth. Note: This lake receives the discharge (coming from the South) of some lakes;
  towards the South, then the North crossing an unidentified lake for its full length to its mouth. Note: This lake receives the discharge (coming from the South) of some lakes;

Lower course of the Grande Loutre river (segment of )

  towards the North-East, crossing on  an unidentified lake to its mouth. Note: This lake receives the discharge (coming from South) from few lakes;
  towards the North, up to a curve in the river, corresponding to a stream (coming from the Northwest);
  towards the east, forming a large M and making a detour to the south at the end of the segment, until its mouth.

The Grande Loutre river flows onto the west bank of the Péribonka river, at:
  downstream from the mouth of the Savane River;
  north-west of Onistagane Lake;
  north-west of Témiscamie Lake;
  northwest of a bay on the northwest shore of Manouane Lake;
  south-west of Piacouadie Lake;
  south of a bay in Onistagane Lake;
  to the southwest of a bay in Lake Manouane;
  northwest of the mouth of Lake Péribonka;
  northwest of the mouth of the Manouane River;
  northwest of the mouth of the Péribonka River (confluence with lac Saint-Jean).

From the mouth of the Grande Loutre river, the current descends the course of the Péribonka river on  towards the south, crosses Lake Saint-Jean on  eastward, then on  follows the course of the Saguenay River eastward to the height of Tadoussac where it meets the Saint Lawrence River.

Toponymy 
The toponym of "Rivière de la Grande Loutre" was made official on March 3, 1971, at the Place Names Bank of the Commission de toponymie du Québec.

See also 

 List of rivers of Quebec

References 

Rivers of Saguenay–Lac-Saint-Jean
Maria-Chapdelaine Regional County Municipality